Lost Village(s) or The Lost Village may refer to:

Places
 Abandoned villages
 Deserted medieval villages
 Lost Villages, a group of ten villages in Ontario, Canada

Entertainment
 Lost Village Festival, a festival in Norton Disney, Lincolnshire, England, UK
 The Lost Village (film), a 1947 French drama film
  The Lost Village (TV series), 2017 Japanese animated TV show
  Smurfs: The Lost Village, a 2017 3D animated U.S. children's film

See also
 A Village Lost and Found (2009 book) stereoscopic photo book of vintage photos
 Lost Bridge Village, Arkansas, USA
 The Village (disambiguation)
 Lost (disambiguation)
 Lost city (disambiguation)